Playaz Circle is an American hip hop duo signed to the Def Jam Recordings record label, composed of rappers 2 Chainz and Dolla Boy.

History

1997–2010: Beginnings and debut album 
The duo was formed in 1997 by childhood friends Tity Boi (later known as 2 Chainz) and Dolla Boy in College Park, Georgia. The duo put all their money together to release their independent album United We Stand, United We Fall. The album included features from Lil Fate, I-20 and others from the Disturbing tha Peace family. They were introduced to Ludacris by Lil Fate and soon became good friends.

Shortly after, Dolla Boy was incarcerated and Tity Boi was shot. As a result, no material was released from the duo until 2007. In January 2010, Playaz Circle filmed a music video for their single "Big Dawg" featuring Lil Wayne and Birdman at Studio Space Atlanta.

2012–present: Upcoming project 
In late 2012 or early 2013, their two studio albums were removed from iTunes, most likely because of a copyright claim on the duo's name. In December 2013, 2 Chainz confirmed that he had been recently working with Dolla Boy and that the duo was planning to release another project together.

Discography

Albums

Singles

References

External links
Playaz Circle on MocoSpace
Playaz Circle French Biography

American hip hop groups
Southern hip hop groups
Def Jam Recordings artists
Musical groups from Georgia (U.S. state)
Hip hop duos
American musical duos
Musical groups established in 1997
2 Chainz